Dicliptera mucronifolia is a plant that is native of Cerrado vegetation in Brazil. This plant is cited in Flora Brasiliensis by Carl Friedrich Philipp von Martius.

External links
 Flora Brasiliensis: Dicliptera mucronifolia 
  Dicliptera mucronifolia is cited in Cerrado vegetation of Brazil.

Acanthaceae
Flora of Brazil
Flora of the Cerrado